The 2021 Pirelli GT4 America Series is the third season of the GT4 America Series. The season began on 5 March at Sonoma Raceway and ended on 17 October at Indianapolis Motor Speedway.

Calendar
The final calendar was announced on 3 October 2020, featuring seven rounds. The round at Canadian Tire Motorsports Park was later canceled. In June, Sebring International Raceway was announced as the CTMP round's replacement.

Entry list

Footnotes

Race results
Bold indicates overall winner.

Championship standings
Scoring system
Championship points are awarded for the first ten positions in each race. Entries are required to complete 75% of the winning car's race distance in order to be classified and earn points. Individual drivers are required to participate for a minimum of 25 minutes in order to earn championship points in any SprintX race.

Driver's championships

†: Post-event penalty. Car moved to back of class.

Team's championships
{|
|

See also
2021 GT World Challenge America

References

External links
Official Website

GT4 America Series